Mubarakpur is a town and a municipal board in Azamgarh district in the Indian state of Uttar Pradesh. It is located at a distance of 13 km north-east of the district headquarters in Azamgarh.

Geography
It has an average elevation of 69 metres (226 feet).

Demographics
The total population of Mubarakpur is 70,463 as of 2011 census. Males constitute 51.3% of the population whereas females 48.7%.

Economy
Mubarakpur is notable for the manufacture of sarees, which are exported.

Notable places
The Temple of Thakurji and Mosque of Raja Mubarak Shah Jama Masjid are well known places of worship. The Al Jamiatul Ashrafiya is an Islamic seminary of Ahle-Sunnat Muslims in India.

Notable persons
 Abdur-Rahman Mubarakpuri
 Safiur Rahman Mubarakpuri
 Shukrullah Mubarakpuri
 Qazi Athar Mubarakpuri

References

Cities and towns in Azamgarh district